Eduard Koschwitz (7 October 1851, Breslau – 14 May 1904, Königsberg) was a Romance philologist.

In 1877 he became docent at Strassburg and afterward was made professor at Greifswald (1881) and Marburg. His specialty was French and Occitan. His works include:
 Ueber die Provenzalischen Feliber und Ihre Vorgänager, Wilhelm Gronau, 1894.
 Ueberlieferung und Sprache der Chanson du voyage de Charlemagne à Jérusalem, 1876
 Les plus anciens monuments de la langue française, 1889
 Grammatik der neufranzösischen Schriftsprache (16.-19. Jahrhundert), 1889
 Les parlers parisiens, 1893
 Les Français avant, pendant et après la guerre de 1870-1871; 
 Grammaire historique de la langue des félibres., 1894
 Miréio, poème provençal de Frédéric Mistral, 1900
 "La Phonétique expérimentale et la philologie franco-provençale". Revue des patois gallo-romans, tome 4 (1891).
 (avec K. Bartsch), Chrestomathie provençale (Xe-XVe siècles), 1904
 Abbé Rousselot, Edouard Koschwitz. Extrait de la Revue de l'Institut catholique de Paris, juillet-août 1906. 24 p. in-8°
Ueber die Chanson du Voyage de Charlemagne (1875; new edition, 1907)
An edition of that Chanson (1883)
Commentar zu den ältesten französischen Sprachdenkmälern (1886)
Neufranzösische Formenlehre nach ihrem Lautstande (1888)
Zur Aussprache des Französische (1892)
Französische Novellistik- und Roman-litteratur über 1870–1871 (1893)
Grammaire historique de la langue des Félibres (1894)
Anleitung zum Studium der französischen Philologie (1897; third edition, 1907)
Altfranzösisches Uebungsbuch (1884; fourth edition, 1911), with Wendelin Förster

Koschwitz was editor of several philological periodicals.

Biography

 Max Kaluza and Gustav Thurau, Eduard Koschwitz. Ein Lebensbild, in Zeitschrift für französischen und englischen Unterricht, 3 (1904), 385–432 (also as separate printing by Weidmann, Berlin 1904).

References

German philologists
1851 births
1904 deaths
Writers from Wrocław
Academic staff of the University of Marburg
Academic staff of the University of Greifswald
German male writers